Arnold Francis Hendy (18941958) was an architect.

Early life and education
He was allegedly born in Plymouth in 1894, although he doesn't appear in the English census of 1901.

World War I
He served with the Devonshire Regiment in Palestine and France.

Architectural career
He entered the offices of W.H.Byrne & Son and became a student of the Royal Institute of the Architects of Ireland for two years, winning the Downes Bronze Medal for 1920-1921 and the Institute Prize for 1921-1922.

In 1924 he became an assistant at the office of Kaye-Parry & Ross. George Murray Ross died in 1927 and William Kaye-Parry in 1932.

Hendy carried on the practice under the same name until his death in March 1956.

His works include the Pembroke Carnegie Free Library in Ballsbridge, No.35-36 Westmoreland Street and Archer's Garage.

References

20th-century Irish architects
20th-century English architects